Milwaukee County is located in the U.S. state of Wisconsin. At the 2020 census, the population was 939,489, down from 947,735 in 2010. It is both the most populous and most densely populated county in Wisconsin, and the 45th most populous county nationwide; Milwaukee, its eponymous county seat, is also the most populous city in the state. The county was created in 1834 as part of Michigan Territory and organized the following year.

Milwaukee County is the most populous county of the Milwaukee-Waukesha-West Allis, WI Metropolitan Statistical Area, as well as of the Milwaukee-Racine-Waukesha, WI Combined Statistical Area (See Milwaukee metropolitan area).

Uniquely among Wisconsin counties, Milwaukee County is completely incorporated (i.e.: no part of the county has the Town form of local government - see Administrative divisions of Wisconsin#Town). There are 19 municipalities in Milwaukee County, 10 incorporated as cities and 9 incorporated as villages. After the city of Milwaukee, the most populous in 2019 were West Allis (59,890), Wauwatosa (48,118), Greenfield, Wisconsin (37,221), Oak Creek, Wisconsin (36,325), and Franklin, Milwaukee County, Wisconsin (35,811). The county is home to two major-league professional sports teams, the Milwaukee Bucks and Milwaukee Brewers, and one of the world's largest music festivals, Summerfest.

History
Portions of what is now Milwaukee County are known to have been inhabited by a number of Native American tribes, including the Sauk, Meskwaki or "Fox", Menomonee, Ojibwe and Potawotami, with elements of other tribes attested as well.

In 1818, when the land later to be Wisconsin was made part of Michigan Territory, territorial governor Lewis Cass created Brown County, which at that time included all the land now part of Milwaukee County. It remained a part of Brown county until 1834, when Milwaukee County was created, including the area south of the line between townships eleven and twelve north (i.e., the northern boundary of Washington and Ozaukee counties), west of Lake Michigan, north of Illinois, and east of the line which now separates Green and Rock counties. This territory encompassed all of what are now Milwaukee, Jefferson, Kenosha, Ozaukee, Racine, Rock, Walworth, Washington, and Waukesha counties, as well as large parts of the present-day Columbia, Dane and Dodge counties.

Milwaukee County remained attached to Brown County for judicial purposes until August. 25, 1835, when an act was passed by the Michigan territorial legislature giving it an independent organization. In 1836, the legislature divided the area south and east of the Wisconsin and Fox rivers into counties, as a consequence reducing Milwaukee County's extent to what is now Milwaukee and Waukesha counties. In 1846 Waukesha County was created by taking from Milwaukee all of the territory west of range 21, reducing Milwaukee County to its present boundaries.

Geography
It is the third-smallest county in Wisconsin by land area. It is watered by the Milwaukee, Menomonee, Kinnickinnic, and Root Rivers. The surface is undulating, and the soil calcareous and fertile.

Adjacent counties
 Ozaukee County - north
 Racine County - south
 Waukesha County - west
 Washington County - northwest
 Ottawa County, Michigan - east (across Lake Michigan)

Climate

Demographics

Birth related statistics
In 2017, there were 13,431 births, giving a general fertility rate of 63.8 births per 1000 women aged 15–44, which is slightly above the Wisconsin average of 60.1. Additionally, there were 2,347 reported induced abortions performed on women of Milwaukee County residence, with a rate of 11.1 abortions per 1000 women aged 15–44, which is above the Wisconsin average rate of 5.2.

2020 census
As of the census of 2020, the population was 939,489. The racial makeup of the county was 52.0% White, 26.2% Black or African American, 4.9% Asian, 0.8% Native American, 6.8% from other races, and 9.3% from two or more races. Ethnically, the population was 16.3% Hispanic or Latino of any race.

2010 census
As of the 2010 census, there were 947,735 people, 383,591 households, and 221,019 families residing in the county. The population density was 3,932 people per square mile (1,528/km2). There were 418,053 housing units at an average density of 1,734 per square mile (674/km2). The racial makeup of the county was 60.6% White, 26.8% Black or African American, 0.7% Native American, 3.4% Asian, 0.003% Pacific Islander, 5.4% from other races, and 3.0% from two or more races. 13.3% of the population were Hispanic or Latino of any race.

There were 383,591 households, of which 28.0% had children under the age of 18 living with them, 35.1% were married couples living together, 17.4% had a female householder with no husband present, and 42.4% were non-families. 33.7% of all households were made up of individuals, and 10.1% had someone living alone who was 65 years of age or older. The average household size was 2.41 and the average family size was 3.14.

In the county, the age distribution was spread out, with 24.9% under the age of 18, 11.4% from 18 to 24, 28.1% from 25 to 44, 24.1% from 45 to 64, and 11.5% who were 65 years of age or older. The median age was 33.6 years. For every 100 females there were 93.4 males.  For every 100 females age 18 and over, there were 90.2 males.

2000 census
As of the 2000 census, there were 940,164 people, 377,729 households and 225,126 families resided in the county. The population density was 3,931 people per square mile (1,503/km2). There were 400,093 housing units at an average density of 1,656 per square mile (640/km2). The racial makeup of the county was 65.6% White, 24.6% Black or African American, 0.7% Native American, 2.6% Asian, 0.04% Pacific Islander, 4.2% from other races, and 2.2% from two or more races. 8.8% of the population were Hispanic or Latino of any race. 25.0% were of German, 10.9% Polish and 5.3% Irish ancestry.

There were 377,729 households, of which 29.5% had children under the age of 18 living with them, 39.0% were married couples living together, 16.3% had a female householder with no husband present, and 40.4% were non-families. 33.0% of all households were made up of individuals, and 10.7% had someone living alone who was 65 years of age or older. The average household size was 2.43 and the average family size was 3.13.

In the county, the age distribution was spread out, with 26.4% under the age of 18, 10.5% from 18 to 24, 30.3% from 25 to 44, 20.0% from 45 to 64, and 12.9% who were 65 years of age or older. The median age was 34 years. For every 100 females there were 92.0 males. For every 100 females age 18 and over, there were 88.1 males.

According to the U.S. Census Bureau, from 1980 to 2000, the residential pattern of Blacks versus Whites in Milwaukee County was the most segregated in the country.

Religious statistics 
In 2010 statistics, the largest religious group in Milwaukee County was the Archdiocese of Milwaukee, with 199,153 Catholics worshipping at 80 parishes, followed by 32,340 non-denominational adherents with 126 congregations, 28,274 Missouri Synod Lutherans with 44 congregations, 23,043 ELCA Lutherans with 50 congregations, 20,416 Wisconsin Synod Lutherans with 45 congregations, 18,127 NBC Baptists with 27 congregations, 12,191 CoGiC Pentecostals with 28 congregations, 12,121 SBC Baptists with 32 congregations, 10,960 AoG Pentecostals with 20 congregations, and an estimated 9,156 Muslims with 8 congregations. Altogether, 46.4% of the population was claimed as members by religious congregations, although members of historically African-American denominations were underrepresented due to incomplete information. In 2014, Milwaukee County had 483 religious organizations, the 48th most out of all 3,141 US counties.

Government
Milwaukee County is governed through an eighteen-member Board of Supervisors and by an elected county executive. County supervisors, the county executive, and the county comptroller run in nonpartisan elections while other countywide officials, such as the district attorney and sheriff, run in partisan elections.

Politics
Like most urban counties, Milwaukee County is a Democratic stronghold, having voted for the Democratic presidential nominee in every election since 1960, and in all but four since 1912.

However, there have been some notable exceptions. Former County Sheriff David Clarke, while repeatedly nominated and elected as a Democrat, was initially appointed by a Republican governor, stated that he considered himself nonpartisan, and espoused politically conservative positions. Former County Executive Scott Walker was a Republican member of the Wisconsin State Assembly before being elected county executive in a 2002 special election and elected to full terms in 2004 and 2008, though the office of county executive is nonpartisan. Former Governor Tommy Thompson, a Republican, won Milwaukee County in his 1994 and 1998 reelection campaigns—to date, the last time a statewide Republican candidate won the county.

In May 2019, the Milwaukee County executive became the first local government in the US to issue a declaration stating that racism constitutes a public health emergency.

Transportation
Bus service in Milwaukee County is provided by the Milwaukee County Transit System, which operates almost 370 buses. The city of Milwaukee also operates The Hop tram system in the downtown area.

Airports
 Milwaukee Mitchell International Airport (KMKE) is located in Milwaukee and serves the entire metropolitan area. It has scheduled service to cities across the United States as well as Canada and Mexico.
 Lawrence J. Timmerman Airport (KMWC) also serves the county and surrounding communities.

Railroads
Amtrak
Canadian Pacific
Union Pacific
Wisconsin and Southern Railroad
Milwaukee Intermodal Station
Milwaukee Airport Railroad Station
The Hop (streetcar)

Buses
Milwaukee County Transit System
List of intercity bus stops in Wisconsin

Major highways

  Interstate 41
  Interstate 43
  Interstate 94
  Interstate 794
  Interstate 894
  U.S. Highway 18
  U.S. Highway 41
  U.S. Highway 45
  Highway 24
  Highway 32
  Highway 36
  Highway 38
  Highway 57
  Highway 59
  Highway 100
  Highway 119
  Highway 145
  Highway 175
  Highway 181
  Highway 190
  Highway 241
  Highway 794

Communities

Cities

 Cudahy
 Franklin
 Glendale
 Greenfield
 Milwaukee (county seat) - partly in Waukesha and Washington Counties
 Oak Creek
 South Milwaukee
 St. Francis
 Wauwatosa
 West Allis

Villages

 Bayside (partly in Ozaukee County)
 Brown Deer
 Fox Point
 Greendale
 Hales Corners
 River Hills
 Shorewood
 West Milwaukee
 Whitefish Bay

Former towns/neighborhoods

 Bay View
 Good Hope
 Granville
 Lake
 Town of Milwaukee
 New Coeln
 North Milwaukee
 Oakwood
 Root Creek
 St. Martin's

Education
School districts include:

K-12:

 Brown Deer School District
 Cudahy School District
 Franklin Public School District
 Greendale School District
 Greenfield School District
 Milwaukee School District
 Oak Creek-Franklin School District
 St. Francis School District
 Shorewood School District
 South Milwaukee School District
 Wauwatosa School District
 West Allis School District
 Whitefish Bay School District
 Whitnall School District

Secondary:
 Nicolet Union High School District

Elementary:
 Fox Point Joint No. 2 School District
 Glendale-River Hills School District
 Maple Dale-Indian Hill School District

Charter schools:
 Hmong American Peace Academy

See also
 Hunger Task Force, Inc.
 National Register of Historic Places listings in Milwaukee County, Wisconsin

References

External links
 Milwaukee County government website
 Milwaukee County map from the Wisconsin Department of Transportation
 Milwaukee County Transit System

 
1835 establishments in Michigan Territory
Populated places established in 1835